Krishna is a 2007 Indian Kannada-language film starring Ganesh, Pooja Gandhi and Sharmila Mandre. It was directed by M. D. Sridhar and produced by Ramesh Yadav. The film is a unofficial remake of the Tamil film Unnai Ninaithu.  The film was remade in Odia in 2015 as Bhala Pae Tate 100 Ru 100 starring Babushan.

Synopsis
The story is about Krishna (Ganesh), an anchor for a popular television show. Krishna is a paying guest at the house of Krishnakumar whose daughter Pooja (Pooja Gandhi) is secretly in love with him, though she pretends to dislike him.

When Pooja confesses her love to Krishna, he tells her of his previous life, when he was a nobody and was deeply in love with Anjali (Sharmila Mandre) whose entire family was poverty stricken and Krishna helped them out wherever and whenever he could. Anjali loves Krishna as well and everyone including Krishna assumes that he will end up with Anjali. However, when one of Anjali's wealthy relatives arrives, pays attentions to her, and asks her to marry him so that he can help her study medicine which is her dream, Anjali agrees to her family's wish that she marry this rich relative and break off with Krishna. A heartbroken Krishna comes to Bangalore unable to bear the sorrow.

Pooja is confident that she will win Krishna's love. However, Anjali comes back into Krishna's life – when her fiancé has ditched her. She is now penniless and Krishna helps her out by getting her a medical seat and helping her out. Anjali falls in love with Krishna and in the end when she is about to commence her career as a doctor, she informs him of her love. Krishna tells her that he helped her out not out of love but out of pity. He gives her a sermon on love and tells her that his love for her is a thing of the past. Anjali leaves sadder but wiser.

Krishna gets together with Pooja, and the pair walk away happily leaving the audience to assume they live happily ever after.

Cast

 Ganesh as "Video Jackie" Krishna
 Pooja Gandhi as Pooja
 Sharmila Mandre as Anjali
 Avinash as Anjali's father
 Vinaya Prasad as Anjali's mother
 Bharath Bhagavathar as Pooja's father 
 Sudha Belawadi as Pooja's mother 
 Rashmi in a special appearance
 Sharan as Rama, Krishna's friend
 Ramaswamy as television channel owner 
 Krishnendra Pandith
 Vijaya Sarathi as garment shop owner
 Ramesh Yadav in a special appearance 
 Suresh Anchan
 Roopika (credited as Baby Roopika)
 M. D. Sridhar in a special appearance

Soundtrack

V. Harikrishna composed the background score and music for the film's soundtrack. The lyrics were penned by K. Kalyan, Kaviraj and Jayant Kaikini. The album consists of five tracks.

Critical response
A critic from Rediff.com wrote that "Krishna will be a treat for Ganesh fans". A critic from Deccan Herald wrote that the film had "The right mix of emotion, humour and action".

Box-office 
In five theatres Krishna completed 100-days, while in 25 theatres the film completed 50 days.

Awards and nominations

References

External links
 

2000s Kannada-language films
2007 films
Kannada remakes of Tamil films
Kannada films remade in other languages
Films scored by V. Harikrishna
Films directed by M. D. Sridhar